An infant bodysuit or onesie (American English) is a garment designed to be worn by babies much like a T-shirt; they are distinguished from T-shirts by an extension below the waist, with snaps that allow it to be closed over the crotch. The purpose of the opening at the crotch is to facilitate access to the infant's diaper as well as preventing the garment from riding up the infant's body and exposing skin. Like T-shirts, infant bodysuits come in a wide variety of designs and may be worn as undergarments or as outer shirts.

Synonyms
Other names of this outfit include onesies (a registered trademark often used in the United States as if it were generic), creepers, diaper shirts, or snapsuits. If the bodysuit is sleeveless, it may also be referred to as a vest (British English only).

Types and design 
An infant bodysuit may be sleeveless, have long sleeves, or have short sleeves. A common feature of the bodysuit is the lap neck (figures 1 and 2). This design makes it easier to get the head through the neck of the bodysuit, as babies have large heads proportional to their bodies, and additionally have poor head control, making traditional neck openings less suitable. Bodysuits without the lap neck may have snaps at the neck instead (figure 3).

See also
Babygrow
Bodysuit
Infant clothing
One-piece (disambiguation)
Romper suit

References

Infants' clothing
One-piece suits
History of fashion
Children's underwear